Calvin Lockhart (born Bert McClossy Cooper; October 18, 1934March 29, 2007) was a Bahamian–American stage and film actor.  Lockhart was perhaps best known for his roles as Reverend Deke O'Malley in the 1970 film Cotton Comes to Harlem and Biggie Smalls in the 1975 Warner Bros. film Let's Do It Again.

Early life
Lockhart was born Bert McClossy Cooper, the youngest of eight children in Nassau, Bahamas. Lockhart's father was Eric Cooper (1912/1913–1976), a Bahamian tailor. Lockhart moved to New York City, New York, when he was 18. He spent one year at the Cooper Union School of Engineering, then left to pursue an acting career. He drove a taxi and operated a carpentry business in the borough of Queens while trying to establish a career as an actor.

Career
In 1960, Lockhart made his Broadway debut, playing a gang leader in The Cool World (a dramatization of Warren Miller's novel of the same name), which closed after just two performances. Lockhart then traveled to Italy and formed his own theater company in which he both acted and directed, before moving to West Germany and then England, where he landed various roles on British television and small roles in films such as 1968's A Dandy in Aspic and Salt and Pepper.

Lockhart's first notable screen role was in Joanna, a 1968 film about an interracial romance, set in London. Joanna was directed by Michael Sarne, who subsequently cast Lockhart in the notorious Myra Breckinridge. Lockhart's first lead role in a film was in Halls of Anger (1970), playing a former basketball star who becomes vice-principal of an inner-city high school to which 60 white students are being moved. An article in The New York Times that year described Lockhart as having "matinee-idol looks" with "chiseled-out-of-marble features" and "skin the color of brown velvet". He also starred in Cotton Comes to Harlem (1970, based on the Chester Himes novel of the same name) as the Reverend Deke O'Malley. In 1974, Lockhart became an actor-in-residence at the Royal Shakespeare Company in Stratford-upon-Avon, England. In the 1980s he was a guest star for seven episodes in the prime-time soap opera Dynasty, playing Jonathan Lake. He is familiar to horror film fans after his performance as the millionaire big-game hunter in The Beast Must Die (1974).

Later years, death and legacy
Lockhart headed a Los Angeles campaign called "Getting Off Drugs," an anti-drug effort to get teenagers off drugs in the late-1970s. Lockhart returned to the Bahamas in the late 1990s and worked as a director on several productions of the Freeport Players Guild. Lockhart's last film role was in Rain, a movie that was shot in the Bahamas and was released in 2007. Lockhart died on March 29, 2007, in a Nassau hospital from stroke-related complications, at the age of 72.

Personal life
Lockhart was married four times and had two sons. In 1972, he married Jamaican model Thelma Walters; they divorced in 1978. In August 1982, Lockhart married British businesswoman Lynn Sloan in the Bahamas; they later divorced. Calvin met his fourth and final wife Jennifer Miles in 1979 which led to the birth of actor Julien Lockhart Miles in 1981. The couple officially married 25 years later in 2006, with Julien walking his Mom down the aisle. In addition to Julien, Lockhart has another son named Leslie Lockhart.

Pop culture
Lockhart character's name in the 1975 film Let's Do It Again, Biggie Smalls, was used by musical artist Christopher Wallace for his 1991 demo, and was still used by media and friends after a lawsuit forced Wallace to change it to Notorious B.I.G.

Filmography 
 1961 Venere creola as Melchiorre
 1963 Cleopatra as Minor Role (uncredited)
 1965 Family Christmas (TV)
 1966 Talking to a Stranger (TV Series) as Leonard
 1967 Girl in a Black Bikini (TV Series) as Lee Anderson
 1967 Drums Along the Avon as Bus Driver
 1968 The Mercenaries as President Mwamini Ubi
 1968 A Dandy in Aspic as Brogue
 1968 Light Blue (The Wednesday Play) (TV Series) as Damon Page
 1968 Only When I Larf as Ali Lin
 1968 Salt and Pepper as Jones
 1968 Nobody Runs Forever as "Jamaica"
 1968 Joanna as Gordon
 1970 Halls of Anger as Quincy Davis
 1970 Leo the Last as Roscoe, The Pimp
 1970 Cotton Comes to Harlem as Deke "Reverend" O'Malley
 1970 Myra Breckinridge as Irving Amadeus
 1972 Melinda as Frankie J. Parker
 1973 Le Grabuge as Pablo
 1973-1974 Every Nigger is a Star
 1974 Contratto carnale as Ruma / Kofi
 1974 The Beast Must Die as Tom Newcliffe
 1974 Uptown Saturday Night as "Silky Slim"
 1974 Honeybaby, Honeybaby as "Liv"
 1978 Good Times (TV Series) as Raymond, Florida Evans' Gambler Cousin
 1975 Let's Do It Again as "Biggie" Smalls
 1975 The Marijuana Affair
 1977 The Baron as Jason
 1978 Starsky & Hutch (TV Series) as Allen "Angel" Walter
 1980 The Baltimore Bullet as "Snow" White
 1988 Coming to America as Colonel Izzi
 1990 Wild at Heart as Reggie
 1990 Predator 2 as Willie "King Willie"
 1992 Twin Peaks: Fire Walk with Me as The Electrician
 2008 Rain as Samuel
 2014 Twin Peaks: The Missing Pieces as The Electrician (final film role; scenes filmed in 1992)

References

External links

McLellan, Dennis, "Calvin Lockhart, 72; Bahamian-born actor", The Los Angeles Times, April 7, 2007.
"The Cocoa Lounge Remembers Calvin Lockhart". Biography. Cocoalounge.com
Calvin Lockhart(Aveleyman)

American male film actors
American male stage actors
Bahamian male film actors
Bahamian emigrants to the United States
People from Nassau, Bahamas
1934 births
2007 deaths
20th-century American male actors